The Commercial Bank of Kuwait, (known as , Al Tijari, commercial) was established on 19 June 1960.  It is the second oldest bank of Kuwait, it has major role in retail and commercial financing.

References

External links
Official website

Banks of Kuwait
Banks established in 1960
Kuwaiti companies established in 1960
Companies listed on the Boursa Kuwait